Smyrna is an unincorporated community in Nuckolls County, Nebraska, United States.

History
A post office was established at Smyrna in 1887, and remained in operation until it was discontinued in 1913. The community was named after the ancient city of Smyrna.

References

Unincorporated communities in Nuckolls County, Nebraska
Unincorporated communities in Nebraska